Standen is a surname. Notable people with the surname include:

Alison Standen, Australian politician
Amy Standen, American journalist
Anthony Standen (d. 1993), American chemist and entomologist
Clive Standen (born 1981), British actor
Edith Standen (1905–1998), American museum curator and military officer
Jack Standen (1909–1973), Australian track racing cyclist
Jim Standen (born 1935), British footballer
Naomi Standen, British historian